Steven Marshall Herndon (born May 25, 1977) is a former professional American football guard.

Herndon, born and raised in LaGrange, Georgia, attended high school and played on its football team with Warren Mathis, who later became rapper Bubba Sparxxx.

Herndon left the NFL in 2005 after knee and neck injuries. Herndon was most remembered for breaking Jamal Williams leg during a game against the San Diego Chargers. The block was extremely controversial and many called for Herndon to be banned for several games. Herndon was also instrumental in helping the Atlanta Falcons reach the NFC championship game in 2004 earning him the Steve Bartkowski Offensive MVP trophy. The award was given to the five starters and Herndon as he backed up every position that season. 

He currently owns a recovery residence "Safety Net Recovery" in Smyrna, Georgia & Charlotte, North Carolina.

References 

1977 births
Living people
People from LaGrange, Georgia
Players of American football from Georgia (U.S. state)
American football offensive guards
American football offensive tackles
Georgia Bulldogs football players
Denver Broncos players
Barcelona Dragons players
Atlanta Falcons players